Orma Rinehart Smith (September 4, 1904 – July 5, 1982) was a United States district judge of the United States District Court for the Northern District of Mississippi.

Education and career

Born in Booneville, Mississippi, Smith received a Bachelor of Laws from the University of Mississippi School of Law in 1927. He was in private practice in Corinth, Mississippi from 1928 to 1968.

Federal judicial service

On July 17, 1968, Smith was nominated by President Lyndon B. Johnson to a seat on the United States District Court for the Northern District of Mississippi vacated by Judge Claude Feemster Clayton. He was confirmed by the United States Senate on July 25, 1968, and received his commission the same day. He assumed senior status on August 16, 1978. Smith served in that capacity until his death on July 5, 1982.

References

Sources
 

1904 births
1982 deaths
Judges of the United States District Court for the Northern District of Mississippi
United States district court judges appointed by Lyndon B. Johnson
20th-century American judges
People from Booneville, Mississippi
People from Corinth, Mississippi